Khormalu (also Romanized as Khormālū; also known as Khormālī and Khūrmali) is a village in Bedevostan-e Gharbi Rural District, Khvajeh District, Heris County, East Azerbaijan Province, Iran. At the 2006 census, its population was 714, in 148 families.

References 

Populated places in Heris County